The San Diego Sabers are a junior ice hockey team and are a member of United States Premier Hockey League. The team is based in Carlsbad, California, and plays at the Carlsbad Icetown. The team was the fourth team to be known as the San Diego Gulls from 2008 to 2015 until it gave up the nickname to the American Hockey League San Diego Gulls before the 2015–16 season.

History

The franchise was founded in 2001 as the San Diego Surf. At the time, the Western States Hockey League (WSHL) was a Tier III Junior B league before later transitioning to a Junior A in 2007. It played as the Surf from 2001 until 2008 when the team took the name San Diego Gulls, the name of three former hockey franchises in San Diego.

Prior to the 2011–12 season, the WSHL and all its team members, including the Gulls, became Amateur Athletic Union sanctioned instead of USA Hockey, the first Junior A hockey league to make that transition.

In February 2015, it was announced that the team has changed its name to San Diego Sabers for the 2015–16 season as the San Diego Gulls name would be used by the new San Diego AHL team.

In 2017, the Sabers were sold to former Czech national team and Olympian Tomas Kapusta.

In 2020, the Sabers left the WSHL and joined another independent junior hockey league, the United States Premier Hockey League (USPHL), in the Premier Division. The team also relocated from Iceplex Escondido in Escondido, California, to Carlsbad Icetown in Carlsbad, California.

Season-by-season records

Alumni
The Gulls have had a number of alumni move on to college ice hockey, higher levels of junior ice hockey, and professional ice hockey.
 David Brito — San Diego Gulls (ECHL), US National Inline Hockey Team
 Ted Lauer (2014–15) —  Lake Forest College Lake Forest, Illinois, NCAA Division III
 Cameron Todd (2014–15) —  NACKA HK Team A, Sweden

References

External links
 Official San Diego Sabers Website
 Official WSHL Website

Ice hockey teams in San Diego
Ice hockey clubs established in 2001
2001 establishments in California